USS Yacal (YFB-688) was a small ferry that served in the United States Navy from 1932 to 1942. She was named after the yacal tree, which has hard wood, which was also the primary construction material used to build her.

Construction and design
Yacal was constructed in the Philippine Islands by the Cavite Navy Yard. She was launched on 15 September 1932, and completed on 11 November 1932. She was constructed principally of yacal wood and burned coal for fuel. She was propelled by a steam engine, and had no weapons.

Service history
Yacal was assigned to the 16th Naval District, and based in the Cavite Navy Yard, where she performed yard duties for almost a decade. When Japanese forces invaded the Philippines in December 1941, Yacal was destroyed on 2 January 1942. Records do not indicate whether she was destroyed by her own forces to prevent capture, or else by the Japanese. She was struck from the Navy List on 24 July 1942.

Awards
American Defense Service Medal
Asiatic–Pacific Campaign Medal with one battle star
World War II Victory Medal
Philippine Defense Medal with service star

References

External links
 Navsource.org

Ships built in the Philippines
1932 ships
World War II auxiliary ships of the United States
Ferries of the United States Navy
World War II shipwrecks in the Pacific Ocean
Maritime incidents in January 1942